Noah Ariake Triumph 2022 was a professional wrestling event promoted by CyberFight's sub-brand Pro Wrestling Noah. It took place on October 30, 2022, in Tokyo, Japan, at the Ariake Arena. The event aired on CyberAgent's AbemaTV online linear television service and CyberFight's streaming service Wrestle Universe.

Background

Storylines
The event featured eleven professional wrestling matches that resulted from scripted storylines, where wrestlers portrayed villains, heroes, or less distinguishable characters in the scripted events that built tension and culminated in a wrestling match or series of matches.

Event
The event started with the pre-show confrontation between rookies Taishi Ozawa and Kai Fujimura whih concluded with the victory of the latter competitor. The first match of the main card saw Kongo (Hajime Ohara, Manabu Soya and Shuji Kondo) defeateing Alejandro, Extreme Tiger and Shuhei Taniguchi in six-man tag team action. Next, Dante Leon and Jack Morris picked up a victory over Daiki Inaba and Yo-Hey. The fourth match portraited a stable clash between Stinger's Chris Ridgeway & Yoshinari Ogawa and Yasutaka Yano who defeated Los Perros del Mal de Japón's Eita, Nosawa Rongai and Super Crazy. Next, El Hijo del Dr. Wagner Jr. and Hideki Suzuki of Sugiura-gun picked up a victory over Masa Kitamiya and Masato Tanaka. In the sixth bout, the first of the five titles put on the line was the GHC Junior Heavyweight Tag Team Championship, which Atsushi Kotoge and Seiki Yoshioka successfully defended against Kongo's Hi69 and Tadasuke. Next, Ninja Mack defeated Hayata by referee's stoppage to capture the GHC Junior Heavyweight Championship, ending the latter's reign at 184 days and 5 defenses. Hayata sustained an injury and was declared unable to continue in the process. In the eighth match, veteran Masakatsu Funaki defeated Kazushi Sakuraba and secured the fifth successful defense of the GHC National Championship. Next, Satoshi Kojima and Takashi Sugiura defeated Kongo's Katsuhiko Nakajima and Kenoh to hit their first successful defense of the GHC Tag Team Championship. The semi main event portraited Keiji Mutoh, Naomichi Marufuji and Yoshiki Inamura defeat New Japan Pro Wrestling's Great Bash Heel (Togi Makabe & Tomoaki Honma) and Hiroshi Tanahashi in one of Mutoh's last appearances in Pro Wrestling Noah.

The main event saw Kaito Kiyomiya marking his first defense of the GHC Heavyweight Championship in his second reign against Kazuyuki Fujita.

Results

References

External links
Pro Wrestling Noah official website

Pro Wrestling Noah
CyberAgent
2022 in professional wrestling
December 2022 events in Japan
Professional wrestling in Tokyo
Pro Wrestling Noah shows